is a Japanese former professional baseball catcher and current coach for the Hanshin Tigers in Japan's Nippon Professional Baseball. He previously played for the Osaka Kintetsu Buffaloes from 1999 to 2004 and the Tohoku Rakuten Golden Eagles from 2005 to 2010 and the Tigers from 2011 to 2015.

External links

NPB stats

1976 births
Living people
Baseball people from Osaka Prefecture
Japanese baseball players
Nippon Professional Baseball catchers
Hanshin Tigers players
Tohoku Rakuten Golden Eagles players
Osaka Kintetsu Buffaloes players
Japanese baseball coaches
Nippon Professional Baseball coaches
People from Higashiōsaka